Argyria vestalis is a moth in the family Crambidae. It was described by Arthur Gardiner Butler in 1878, and is found in Jamaica.

References

Argyriini
Moths described in 1878
Moths of the Caribbean